Augustus William Dunbier (January 1, 1888 – September 11, 1977), was a Nebraskan Impressionist painter, best known for his landscapes. 
Dunbier was educated in Germany and the Art Institute of Chicago. He often worked in the southwest United States and painted landscapes, still lives, and portraits.  One of his students was fellow Nebraska artist Eve Ryder.

References 

1888 births
1977 deaths
20th-century American painters
American male painters
American Impressionist painters
American landscape painters
Federal Art Project artists
20th-century American male artists